Hans Bischoff (17 February 1852 in Berlin – 12 June 1889 in Niederschönhausen) was a German pianist most noted for his edition of Johann Sebastian Bach's keyboard works. He studied with Theodor Kullak in Berlin. He taught piano and theory at Kullak's Neue Akademie der Tonkunst. He also taught at the Stern Conservatory. He was active as a concert pianist.

Along with editing Bach's works, Bischoff also edited and revised his late teacher's book on piano playing.  The book went into multiple German editions, and was also published in English translation in the United States.

References

1889 deaths
1852 births
German classical pianists
Male classical pianists
19th-century classical pianists
19th-century German musicians
19th-century male musicians
19th-century musicians